Astathes gibbicollis is a species of beetle in the family Cerambycidae. It was described by Thomson in 1865.

Subspecies
 Astathes gibbicollis baudoni Breuning, 1962
 Astathes gibbicollis gibbicollis Thomson, 1865
 Astathes gibbicollis siamensis Breuning, 1956
 Astathes gibbicollis tenasserimensis Breuning, 1956
 Astathes gibbicollis tibialis (Pic, 1921)

References

G
Beetles described in 1865